Pattipulam is a 2019 Indian Tamil language comedy-drama film written and directed by Suresh on his directorial debut. The film stars Veerasamar and Amitha Rao in the lead roles while Yogi Babu play supportive roles in the film. The film is scheduled to have its theatrical release on 22 March 2019 along with other small budgeted films and received underwhelming responses.

Cast 

Veerasamar as Udhay aka Mokka
Amitha Rao as Swetha
Cheranraj
Yogi Babu as Shilpa Kumar aka Pei
Maris Raja as Saaral
Supergood Subramani

Production 
The film was announced by debut director Suresh who previously worked as an assistant director to Sakthi Chidambaram. The film began production in 2014 under the title Mokka Padam. The filmmakers hired art director Veerasamar in the male lead role and Amitha Rao was chosen to play the female lead. Yogi Babu was hired to play the role of a ghost in the film in a pivotal role.

Release 
The Times of India gave the film one out of five stars and wrote that "The lack of interesting characters or sequences starts testing viewers’ patience just a few minutes into the film".

References

External links 

2019 films
2010s Tamil-language films
2019 comedy-drama films
Indian comedy-drama films
2019 directorial debut films